Westview Freedom Academy is a secondary school (grades 9 through 12) in Windsor, Ontario, managed by the Greater Essex County District School Board.

Westview Freedom Academy was established by the Greater Essex County District School Board in 2014.  The school services Windsor's West end population by offering programs for all levels of learners.
The school offers Academic Classes, Applied Classes, English Language Learner Program, Locally Developed Classes, Adapted Basic Classes, S.T.E.P.S courses, and the Stepping-In program.  
Some of the many programs featured at the school include OYAP, CO-OP, SHSM, SWAC, OPS, Duel Credit Program, & OLS.

See also
List of high schools in Ontario

External links
 School Web Page

Educational institutions established in 1922
High schools in Windsor, Ontario
1922 establishments in Ontario